The 1968 Australian Grand Prix was a motor race held at Sandown Park in Victoria, Australia on 25 February 1968. The race was open to Racing Cars complying with the Australian National Formula or the Australian 1½ Litre Formula. It was the thirty third Australian Grand Prix and was also round seven of the 1968 Tasman Series. 
The race was staged by the Light Car Club of Australia and was sponsored by the Royal Automobile Club of Victoria.

Jim Clark, driving a Lotus 49T, won by 0.1 seconds from Chris Amon (Dino 246), with whom he battled for the lead throughout the race. Clark's victory was rewarded with the Lex Davison Trophy and the Royal Automobile Club of Victoria Trophy. It proved to be the last major victory for the Scotsman. Twice winner of the World Championship of Drivers, three-time Tasman Series champion and the winner of the 1965 Indianapolis 500, Clark was killed in a Formula 2 crash at the Hockenheim circuit in West Germany six weeks after the race.

In his last drive in an Australian Grand Prix, Jack Brabham started the race from pole position but retired with engine failure. Chris Amon set the fastest race lap.

Leo Geoghegan (Lotus 39 Repco V8) was the first Australian resident driver to finish, an achievement which was rewarded with the Langridge Cup.

Classification 
Results as follows:

Notes
 Attendance: 12,000
 Winner's average speed: 101.5 mph (163.3 km/h)

References

External links
 Australian Grand Prix, Sandown Park, 25 Feb 1968, www.oldracingcars.com

Grand Prix
Australian Grand Prix
Motorsport at Sandown
Tasman Series
Australian Grand Prix